The 1982 NBL Finals was the postseason tournament of the National Basketball League's 1982 season, which began in February. The finals began on 16 July. The tournament concluded with the West Adelaide Bearcats defeating the Geelong Cats in the NBL Grand Final on 18 July.

Format
The NBL finals series in 1982 consisted of two semi-final games, and one championship-deciding grand final. The finals were contested between the top four teams of the regular season, with the finals weekend hosted at the neutral Newcastle Sports Entertainment Centre in Newcastle, New South Wales.

Qualification

Qualified teams

Ladder

The NBL tie-breaker system as outlined in the NBL Rules and Regulations states that in the case of an identical win–loss record, the results in games played between the teams will determine order of seeding.

Bracket

Semi-finals

(2) Geelong Cats vs (3) Nunawading Spectres

(1) West Adelaide Bearcats vs (4) Coburg Giants

Grand Final

(1) West Adelaide Bearcats vs (2) Geelong Cats

See also
 1982 NBL season

References

Finals
National Basketball League (Australia) Finals